The fast-food restaurant chain Burger King was the first major fast food chain to introduce a grilled chicken sandwich to the marketplace, in 1990, six months before Wendy's and four years before McDonald's. Since then, Burger King, and its Australian franchise Hungry Jack's have offered a variety of grilled chicken sandwiches, as have Wendy's and McDonald's.

Their first grilled chicken sandwich, the BK Broiler, was one of the most successful product introductions in the fast food industry ever. It was reformulated as the Chicken Whopper (1992), named after their Whopper Sandwich. That was replaced by the BK Baguette (2004), promoted as health-oriented, which was in turn replaced with the larger, meatier TenderGrill sandwich (2005), targeted to more sophisticated, adult customers, notably 24- to 36-year-old males. 

The company sells different variants in different markets, using white meat chicken breast in some regions while using dark meat chicken thighs in others.

History

BK Broiler 
Burger King's first broiled chicken sandwich, the BK Broiler, was introduced in 1990. It was made with lettuce, tomato and a dill ranch sauce served on an oat dusted roll. At that time, more than 90% of chicken products sold by the major chains were fried. By a month after its introduction, it was selling more than a million units per day, and poaching sales from fried chicken chains such as Kentucky Fried Chicken. The sandwiches were part of an industry trend towards the diversification of menus with healthier products such as reformulated cooking methods and salads. At the time, the sandwich had 379 calories and 18 grams of fat, 10 of which came from the sauce.

The introduction of the BK Broiler was one of the most successful restaurant product launches ever, encouraging the company look into introducing additional products that would match the success of the Broiler. Its success helped Burger King increase its profit margin by 47% over the corresponding six-month period in 1989. By 1992, sales of the BK Broiler had slowed to half of their peak.

The company increased the size of the BK Broiler, along with several other sandwiches, in 1998. The idea behind the upsizing of the product was to give the customer a sense of value, with a company spokesperson stating "When they [the customer] see a lot, it seems like they're getting a lot for their money, and even if they don't eat it all, they think they're being treated fairly."

Chicken Whopper 

As part of the forty-fifth anniversary of its Whopper sandwich in 2002, BK introduced an updated version of the sandwich called the Chicken Whopper and added a smaller version called the Chicken Whopper Jr. sandwich, along with a new Caesar salad sandwich topped with a Chicken Whopper filet. The introduction of the Chicken Whopper represented the company's first move to extend the Whopper brand name beyond beef-based sandwiches since the original Whopper's introduction in the 1950s. A newly reformulated low fat mayonnaise was introduced in conjunction with the new sandwiches. Along with the company's new BK Veggie sandwich, The Chicken Whopper Jr. version of the sandwich was lauded by the Center for Science in the Public Interest as being one of the best nutritionally sound products sold by a fast food chain. Still, the CSPI decried the rest of the Burger King menu as being vastly unhealthy.

Development of the sandwich began in 2001 in response to several major factors. After an overall sales decline of 17% coupled with a profit decline of 29%, Burger King held a series of consumer tests that showed the company's customer base was looking for a wider variety of options when making purchases. Additional survey results revealed that a lack of newer products was discouraging consumers from visiting the chain. Furthermore, the company was seeking to counter the threat to its sales by newer fast casual restaurants that had begun to bite into sales. By July 2002, the chain had sold nearly fifty million of the sandwiches, eventually displacing the BK Broiler's initial launch figures as the company's best selling product introduction. The successful introduction of the Chicken Whopper was one of the few noted positive highlights of the company during negotiations for the sale of Burger King by its owner Diageo to a group of investors led by the TPG Capital; Chicago-based consulting firm Technomic Inc. president Ron Paul was quoted that he was encouraged by recent product changes at Burger King such as the new Chicken Whopper, but he said it's too early to tell whether the changes have been successful. Despite the Chicken Whopper's initial success, just over a year after the Chicken Whopper's introduction enthusiasm for the product was waning; Burger King's largest franchisee, Carrols Corporation, was complaining that the product line was a failure, describing the sandwich as a pedestrian product with a great name. As of November 2013, the Chicken Whopper is the current grilled chicken sandwich sold by Burger King in the Middle East.

With its 2014 expansion into India, Burger King introduced the Chicken Whopper as one of three versions of the Whopper. The other two variants are the Mutton Whopper and the Veggie Whopper.

BK Baguette 

In 2003, BK introduced its BK Baguette line of sandwiches designed to replace the Chicken Whopper. The sandwiches were introduced at the insistence of the new CEO, former Darden Restaurants executive Bradley (Brad) Blum, shortly after the company was acquired by TPG Capital in 2002. The sandwiches were designed to be a lower fat alternative with 5g of fat and 350 or fewer calories. The line was a health conscious oriented product that got its taste from ingredients instead of fat. They were formally introduced in 2003 as its BK Baguette line of sandwiches, that replacing the Chicken Whopper sandwiches.

The baguette sandwiches were introduced to Europe starting in the UK in 2003, with several new varieties designed to cater to the population mix of the country. While the baguette sandwiches were well received and continue to be sold, several red flags have been raised by the British government and private groups in regards the healthiness of these and other products sold by the fast food industry. In 2005, British Food Standards Agency (FSA) cited large levels of fats and salt in the company's beef-based Monterey Melt baguette and chided BK for backing out of an agreement to help make the company's products healthier. In 2007 the private public interest group Consensus Action on Salt and Health, abbreviated to CASH, cited Burger King and other fast food chains over the continued levels of sodium contained in these types of foods. The group specifically claimed that the Chicken BLT Baguette sandwich, when paired with fries and a Coca-Cola, was one of the three saltiest fast food products in the UK.

TenderGrill 

The Baguette sandwiches failed to catch on in the American market, and as a result they were discontinued as part of a menu reorganization. In 2005, they were replaced by the TenderGrill sandwich.

Grilled chicken sandwich 
In 2017, Burger King once again reformulated its grilled chicken sandwich, simply calling it the Grilled Chicken Sandwich. The new formulation replaces the brioche bun with a potato roll and a new seasoned chicken fillet. It was discontinued in 2019.

Competing products 
Similar products from other chains have also been introduced, reformulated and generally been fluid in their presences in the marketplace since 1990. Despite the present day competitive products from multiple vendors, Burger King was the first national fast food chain to bring a broiled chicken sandwich to market, beating rival Wendy's by a period of several months. Wendy's introduced their first grilled chicken product, simply called a grilled chicken sandwich, in August 1990. The sandwich originally was made with grilled chicken on 4-inch bun with lettuce, tomato and a honey mustard sauce. Wendy's introduced a reformulated grilled chicken sandwich in 1996 that they claimed was plumper and juicier.  Wendy's reformulated their grilled chicken product in 2004 as the Ultimate Chicken Grill sandwich during an overhaul of its chicken sandwich line. As of November 2013, the Ultimate Chicken Grill is still Wendy's main grilled sandwich in the United States.

While McDonald's had been trying to develop and test a similar product for several years, the company was caught off guard at the time when its mainline competitors introduced their grilled chicken products and was not able to initially deploy a similar product. This was primarily due to the fact the company's highly specialized kitchens could not produce a high quality product without a large investment in new equipment. By early 1991, McDonald's grilled chicken product was still in development, and the vendor would not introduce its version, the McGrilled Chicken Classic, until 1994. The McGrilled chicken sandwich was replaced with the Grilled Chicken Deluxe sandwich in September and October 1996 as part of McDonald's Deluxe line of "upscale" sandwiches; the company had hoped that a higher value product would help improve average check performance at its stores. However, by 1998 the whole Deluxe line was said to be not selling well, and the Grilled Chicken Deluxe was eliminated when McDonald's brought back the Chicken McGrill sandwich back in 1999. The Chicken McGrill sandwich was retired in 2005 when the company introduced its new Premium line of products, which like the TenderCrisp sandwich was targeted to a more adult audience with higher quality ingredients such as natural cheeses and whole leaf lettuce. Beginning in April 2015, McDonald's moved to a new grilled chicken sandwich, the Artisan Grilled Chicken; the new chicken uses a smaller list of ingredients in the chicken filet, removing ingredients such as maltodextrin and sodium phosphates. The new sandwich is in response to consumer-based market trends of food products that have simpler, more natural ingredients.

Advertising 

A series of ads called @BK, love is guaranteed that were developed by Los Angeles-based ad house Amoeba, guaranteed that customers would receive a free sandwich if they don't "love" the chain's Whopper and Chicken Whopper sandwiches. With the discovery of mad cow disease by the FDA in 2003, the company instructed their advertising agency at the time, Young & Rubicam of New York, to retool a forthcoming series of ads featuring the company's signature product, the Whopper, to include the Chicken Whopper. A Burger King spokesman stated that the change was because Burger King "decided that if there's anybody who wants a chicken option, at this point, we wanted to remind them that the Whopper comes in chicken as well as the original beef," noting their confidence in their beef supply.

The BK Baguettes line was introduced in the United States via an ad campaign from advertising firm Crispin, Porter + Bogusky that featured the tagline "Flavor from grilling not fat." The American advertising campaigns for the sandwiches featured several celebrity chefs, such as Rick Bayless, visiting locations where similar style food stuffs were found, e.g. a farmers' market, and commenting on how these ingredients make the new Baguette line better and more healthy. The advertising firm of Euro RSCG Leedex produced ads for the sandwiches in Great Britain.

The advertising campaign for the TenderGrill sandwich in Spain in 2010 featured a humor-based ad in which men were asked what type of advertisement would get them to buy the sandwich. The responses, which included what men would like to see in the commercials, formed the basis for the ads. The advertisement, made entirely by women, was filmed in London and featured barbarians, ninjas and unicorns in an advertisement that poked fun at the men's preferences. The making of the commercial was the basis of a mini-documentary from UK firm Feral Films. In a 2011 Singapore campaign, Burger King presented an attack advertisement that was designed to counter the introduction of the Chicken McGrill sandwich from McDonald's. The campaign took McDonald's slogan, "Make it better" and changed it to "Make it even Better" and put the sandwich on sale for SGD$1.00 on the same day the McDonald's product was set to debut. Burger King called the McDonald's menu item "fake grilled" as opposed to flame grilled.

Controversies 
The 2012 campaign from Clemenger BBDO for the TenderGrill for the Australian Burger King franchise, Hungry Jack's, featured a goth girl, complete with facial piercings and tattoos that loses her piercings and tattoos as she eats the sandwich. By the time she has finished her meal, her clothing and style had completely changed – much to her and her friends horror. At the end of the commercial, the announcer states the tag line "There is nothing naughty about the new Hungry Jack's TenderGrill ... Hungry Jack's makes it better." The Australian Advertising Standards Bureau received several complaints from the public claiming the commercial demeaned alternative lifestyles, was discriminatory and insulting to non-conformists. The Advertising Standards Board determined that the advertisement did not breach any pertinent anti-discrimination codes, and dismissed the complaint.

See also 

 List of Burger King products
 Original Chicken Sandwich

Similar sandwiches by other sellers:
 McDonald's McChicken sandwich
 McDonald's Deluxe line
 McDonald's Premium line

References

Burger King foods
Brand name poultry meats
Chicken sandwiches